Charlotte Elizabeth McManus (1850–1941) was an Irish nationalist, historian and novelist.

Life and career
Born in Castlebar, Co. Mayo in 1850 to James and Charlotte McManus, McManus was educated at home and in Torquay. She was known as Lil and Lottie, and published as L. McManus. Dermot MacManus was a nephew.

McManus became ardent nationalist and worked as a Gaelic League worker in Kiltimagh, Co. Mayo. Due to her work it is believed up to 7000 people attended a nationalist meeting in the area in 1909. She was on the anti-Treaty side of the Civil War in Ireland. She wrote for Penny Pamphlets, published in the Educational Company of Ireland series. She also contributed chapters to Seumas MacManus book  The Story of the Irish Race (1921). In 1954 her novel Nuala was translated into Irish by Gearoid Mac Spealáin.

She died in Kiltimagh, County Mayo, Ireland on 5 October 1944.

Bibliography

Novels
The Red Star (NY: G. P. Putnam's Sons 1895), Do. (London: T. Fisher Unwin 1896);
Silk of the Kine (London: T. Fisher Unwin 1896), rep. as Silk (NY: Harper 1896);
Lally of the Brigade (London: T. Fisher Unwin; Boston: L. C. Page 1899), Do. (Dublin: Sealy, Bryers & Walder [1902]);
Nessa (Dublin: Sealy, Bryers Walker [1902]);
The Wager (NY: F. M. Buckles [1902]);
In Sarsfield’s Days: A Tale of the Siege of Limerick (Dublin: M. H. Gill 1906);
Nuala: The Story of a Perilous Quest (Dublin: Browne & Nolan 1908);
The Professor in Erin (Dublin: M. H. Gill 1918).

Stories
 Within the Four Seas of Fola (Dublin: M. H. Gill 1922).

Autobiography
White Light and Flame: Memories of the Irish Literary Revival and the Anglo-Irish War (Dublin; Cork: Talbot [1929]).

References

External links
 "McManus, L" entry at The Encyclopedia of Science Fiction

1850 births
1907 deaths
People from Castlebar
Irish fiction writers
19th-century Irish writers